PDF-XChange Viewer is a freemium PDF reader for Microsoft Windows. It was available in a free and a paid version. Its further development has been stopped in favour of the freemium PDF-XChange Editor. It supports saving PDF forms (AcroForms), and import or export form data in FDF/XFDF format. Since version 2.5, there has been partial support for XFA, and exporting form data in XML Data Package (XDP) or XML format. It added OCR support as of version 2.5.

Its Lite print driver enables the creation of PDF files from any Windows app that supports printing. PDF-XChange Standard brings advanced PDF creation options. Several PDF-related SDKs are available for developers, including PDF Tools SDK, PDF-XChange Viewer SDK, PDF-XChange Drivers SDK, and Image SDKs. They enable creation, manipulation, reading, writing, OCR, search, and display of PDF contents in other applications. They support C++, C#, C, the classic Visual Basic, the modern Visual Basic, Delphi, and Clarion.

Its Viewer is compatible with Wine, providing another way to annotate PDFs on Linux.

See also
 List of PDF software

References

External links
 

PDF readers
Windows-only freeware
Portable software